TVSN (an acronym for "Television Shopping Network") is an Australian and New Zealand broadcast, cable television and satellite television network specializing in home shopping. It is owned by parent company Direct Group Pty Ltd, a home marketing and shopping company based in the Sydney suburb of Frenchs Forest, which also owns sister channel Expo.

The channel broadcasts live every day from 08:30 to 21:30 AEST.

History

TVSN began broadcasting in 1995 from their Lane Cove, Sydney headquarters. It was soon listed on the Australian Stock Exchange in 1999 after sustaining some growth.

In 2004, the network was acquired by Innovations Direct Group Pty Ltd, an Australian-based home shopping company which produces a number of direct catalogue publications, including Innovations and Homecare magazines. Channel operations soon moved to new facilities in Frenchs Forest alongside the parent company.

Channels and Live Streaming
Some Australian pay television services carry TVSN as part of their basic subscription package. These services include Foxtel, Austar and Optus TV. It was previously carried by Neighbourhood Cable. The channel is also available free to air via the Optus C1 satellite. In addition, the company's website and their TVSN Now app for Android TV, Samsung, LG and Apple TV broadcasts a live video stream of the channel.

In September 2012, TVSN became available to free-to-air to metropolitan viewers after Network Ten and TVSN partnered to broadcast the channel as a datacast service on LCN 14. From December 2012-July 2016, regional Network Ten affiliate Southern Cross Ten began broadcasting the channel to regional viewers on LCN 54.

On 1 July 2016, Southern Cross Ten became part of Southern Cross Nine affiliated to the Nine Network, while WIN Television became the Network 10 affiliate. Consequently, TVSN would be broadcast on LCN 84 in regional Queensland, Southern New South Wales and ACT, Griffith, regional Victoria, Mildura, Tasmania, Eastern South Australia and regional Western Australia via WIN while Southern Cross Ten would move TVSN in Northern New South Wales and Gold Coast from Channel 54 to Channel 57.

On 2 September 2018 in WIN areas, TVSN became MPEG-4 to collide with the launch of Sky News on WIN.

On 16 September 2020 in Metropolitan areas, TVSN moved from Channel 14 to Channel 16 due to the launch of Network 10's third digital channel 10 Shake.

New Zealand version
From 20 August 2013, Kordia began broadcasting a localised version of the channel on LCN 20 to a national New Zealand audience on the Freeview terrestrial service and the encrypted Sky satellite channel launched at the same time. TVSN was removed from Sky on 19 August 2020.  As of 2022, TVSN is no longer available via Freeview.

From 21 May 2020, TVSN launched the TVSN Now app across Android TV, Samsung, LG and Apple TV which live streams their broadcast for free. The app provides both New Zealand and Australian versions of the stream, selectable in the menu.

Logos

See also
 Expo – TVSN's sister home shopping channel.
 Shopping channels – A list of home shopping channels worldwide.
 Network Ten – Free to air broadcast partner.

References

External links
 Official Website - Australia
 Official Website - New Zealand 
 Watch TVSN Live

Home shopping television stations in Australia
Television channels and stations established in 1995
English-language television stations in Australia
Network 10
1995 establishments in Australia